Al-Basar International Foundation  مؤسسة البصر الخيرية العالمية (executive office in Saudi Arabia) is a non-profit international NGO. It was established in 1989 to work in the field of prevention and eradication/controlling of blindness & blinding diseases.

It works together with King Salman Humanitarian Aid and Relief Center in Yemen, Bangladesh, Sudan, Nigeria and Pakistan to fight blindness and eye disease. and performed surgeries in  Sudan

In a 2019 campaign funded by King Salman Humanitarian Aid and Relief Centre in collaboration with Al Basar International Foundation, medical volunteers from Saudi Arabia met 8000 eye patients and performed 800 eye surgeries to remove cataract and glaucoma in Ibadan, Nigeria, as well as in Lafia in Nasarawa State, Nigeria.

References

External links
  Official website

1989 establishments in Saudi Arabia
Organizations established in 1989
Charities based in Saudi Arabia
Blindness organisations in Saudi Arabia